Solomon's knot is a traditional decorative motif used since ancient times, and found in many cultures. Despite the name, it is classified as a link, and is not a true knot according to the definitions of mathematical knot theory.

Structure 
The Solomon's knot consists of two closed loops, which are doubly interlinked in an interlaced manner. If laid flat, the Solomon's knot is seen to have four crossings where the two loops interweave under and over each other. This contrasts with two crossings in the simpler Hopf link.

In most artistic representations, the parts of the loops that alternately cross over and under each other become the sides of a central square, while four loopings extend outward in four directions. The four extending loopings may have oval, square, or triangular endings, or may terminate with free-form shapes such as leaves, lobes, blades, wings etc.

Occurrences 
The Solomon's knot often occurs in ancient Roman mosaics, usually represented as two interlaced ovals.

Sepphoris National Park, Israel, has Solomon's Knots in stone mosaics at the site of an ancient synagogue.

Across the Middle East, historical Islamic sites show Solomon's knot as part of Muslim tradition. It appears over the doorway of an early twentieth century CE mosque/madrasa in Cairo. Two versions of Solomon's knot are included in the recently excavated Yattir Mosaic in Jordan. To the east, it is woven into an antique Central Asian prayer rug. To the west, Solomon's knot appeared in Moorish Spain, and it shines in leaded glass windows in a late twentieth century CE mosque in the United States. The British Museum, London, England has a fourteenth-century CE Egyptian Qur'an with a Solomon's Knot as its frontispiece. 

University of California at Los Angeles Fowler Museum of Cultural History, USA has a large African collection that includes nineteenth and twentieth century CE Yoruba glass beadwork crowns and masks decorated with Solomon's Knots. 

Home of Peace Mausoleum, a Jewish Cemetery, Los Angeles, California, USA has multiple images of Solomon's knot in stone and concrete bas reliefs sculpted 1934 CE. 

Saint Sophia's Greek Orthodox Cathedral, "Byzantine District" of Los Angeles, California, USA has an olive wood Epitaphios (bier for Christ) with Solomon's knots carved at each corner. The Epitaphios is used in the Greek Easter services. 

Powell Library University of California at Los Angeles, USA has ceiling beams in the Main Reading Room covered with Solomon's Knots. Built in 1926 CE, the reading room also features a central Dome of Wisdom bordered by Solomon's knots.

Name 
It was associated with the Biblical monarch Solomon because of his reputation for wisdom and knowledge (and in some legends, his occult powers). This phrase is usually rendered into English as "Solomon's knot", since "seal of Solomon" has other conflicting meanings (often referring to either a Star of David or pentagram). In the study of ancient mosaics, the Solomon's knot is often known as a "guilloche knot" or "duplex knot", while a Solomon's knot in the center of a decorative configuration of four curving arcs is known as a "pelta-swastika" (where pelta is Latin for "shield").

Among other names currently in use are the following:

 "Foundation Knot" applies to the interweaving or interlacing which is the basis for many elaborate Celtic designs, and is used in the United States in crochet and macramé patterns.
 "Imbolo" describes the knot design on the textiles of the Kuba people of Congo.
  is the Italian term for Solomon's knot, and is used to name the Solomon's knot mosaic found at the ruins of a synagogue at Ostia, the ancient seaport for Rome.

Symbolism 

Since the knot has been used across a number of cultures and historical eras, it can be given a range of symbolic interpretations.

Because there is no visible beginning or ending, it may represent immortality and eternity—as does the more complicated Buddhist Endless Knot.

Because the knot seems to be two entwined figures, it is sometimes interpreted as a Lover's Knot, although that name may indicate another knot.

Because of religious connections, the knot is sometimes designated the all-faith symbol of faith, but, at the same time, it appears in many places as a valued secular symbol of prestige, importance, beauty.

Solomon's Knot appears on tombstones and mausoleums in Jewish graveyards and catacombs in many nations. In this context, Solomon's Knot is currently interpreted to symbolize eternity.

Some seek to connect it with Solomon by translating the Hebrew word peka'im (פקעים) found in the Bible at I Kings 6:18 and I Kings 7:24 as meaning "knobs" or "knots", and interpreting it to refer to Solomon's knot; however, the more accepted modern translation of this word is "gourd-shaped ornaments".

In Africa, Solomon's knot is found on glass beadwork, textiles, and carvings of the Yoruba people. When the knot appears in this culture, it often denotes royal status; thus, it is featured on crowns, tunics, and other ceremonial objects. Also in Africa, the Knot is found on Kasai velvet, the raffia woven cloth of the Kuba people. They attribute mystical meaning to it, as do the Akan people of West Africa who stamp it on their sacred Adinkra cloth. In the Adinkra symbol system, a version of Solomon's knot is the Kramo-bone symbol, interpreted as meaning "one being bad makes all appear to be bad".

In Latvia, when Solomon's knot is used on textiles and metal work, it is associated with time, motion, and the powers of ancient pagan gods.

In modern science, some versions of the conventionalized sign for an atom (electrons orbiting a nucleus) are variations of Solomon's knot. The logo of the Joomla software program is a Solomon's knot.

See also 
 Quatrefoil
 Swastika
 Whitehead link
 Comacine masters

References

Further reading 
A book-length illustrated study of Solomon's Knot is Seeing Solomon's Knot, With Photographs by Joel Lipton by Lois Rose Rose, Los Angeles, 2005 (official website http://www.StoneandScott.com/solomonsknot.asp ).

A few archaeological reports, art books, craft manuals, museum catalogs, auction catalogs, travel books, and religious documents which discuss or depict the Solomon's Knot configuration are listed below:

 Bronze Age Civilization of Central Asia, The: Recent Soviet Discoveries. Armonk, New York: M.E. Sharpe, 1981. (Early examples of Solomon's Knot from the Gonur 1 settlement, figure 4, p. 233.)
 Chen, Lydia. Chinese Knotting. Taiwan: Echo Publishing Company, 1981, . (Instructions for creating a "flat" or Solomon's Knot, p. 58.)
 Christie's Catalog: The Erlenmeyer Collection of Ancient Near Eastern Stamp Seals and Amulets. London: Christie, Manson & Woods, Auction June 6, 1989. (Cruciform interlace carved stone seal, Ubaid, circa 4500 BCE, Lot 185.)
 Fraser, Douglas and Herbert M. Cole, eds. African Art and Leadership. Madison, Milwaukee, and London: University of Wisconsin Press, 1972.
 Cole, Ibo Art and Authority, p. 85.
 Fraser: Symbols of Ashanti Kingship, pp. 143–144.
 Fraser: King's ceremonial stool, personal choices of various African leaders, p,209, p. 215, p. 283, p. 290, p. 318
 Fraser: More attention should be paid to the significance of the Solomon's Knot motif, p. 318.
 Laine, Daniel. African Kings. Berkeley, Toronto: Ten Speed Press, 1991, . (Two Nigerian chiefs, Oba Oyebade Lipede and Alake of Abeokuta, wear garments with embroidered Solomon's Knots, p. 63.)
 Lusini, Aldo. The Cathedral of Sienna. Sienna, Italy: 1950. (The choir stall, carved 1363 to 1425: photographs of stalls showing variations of Solomon's Knot, plate 49, pp. 20–21.)
 Wolpert, Stuart. "UCLA Chemists Make Molecular Rings in the Shape of King Solomon's Knot, a Symbol of Wisdom," News release from the University of California at Los Angeles, January 10, 2007, Newsroom.

External links 

 

Decorative knots
Mythological knots
Solomon
Visual motifs